Mount Marsden is a bare rock mountain,  high, lying  southwest of Mount Rivett in the Gustav Bull Mountains of Mac. Robertson Land, Antarctica. On 13 February 1931 the British Australian New Zealand Antarctic Research Expedition (1929–31) under Douglas Mawson made a landing on nearby Scullin Monolith. They named this mountain for Ernest Marsden, Director of the New Zealand Department of Scientific and Industrial Research.

References

Mountains of Mac. Robertson Land